The Return of Daniel Boone is a 1941 American Western film directed by Lambert Hillyer and written by Paul Franklin and Joseph Hoffman. The film stars Wild Bill Elliott, Betty Miles, Dub Taylor, Ray Bennett, Walter Soderling and Carl Stockdale. The film was released on May 7, 1941, by Columbia Pictures.

Plot

Cast          
Wild Bill Elliott as Wild Bill Boone
Betty Miles as Ellen Brandon
Dub Taylor as Cannonball
Ray Bennett as Leach Killgrain
Walter Soderling as Mayor Elwell
Carl Stockdale as Jeb Brandon
Bud Osborne as Red
Francis Walker as Bowers
Lee Powell as Tax Collector Fuller
Tom Carter as Wagner
Edmund Cobb as Henderson
Verda Rodik as Melinda 
Verna Rodik as Matilda

References

External links
 

1941 films
American Western (genre) films
1941 Western (genre) films
Columbia Pictures films
Films directed by Lambert Hillyer
American black-and-white films
1940s English-language films
1940s American films